Valerius Flaccus is the name of:

 Valerius Flaccus (poet) (died 1st century), Latin poet at the time of Vespasian
 a number of Roman political figures, including:
 Lucius Valerius Flaccus (consul 261 BC)
 Lucius Valerius Flaccus (consul 195 BC)
 Lucius Valerius Flaccus (princeps senatus 86 BC), consul 100 BC
 Gaius Valerius Flaccus (consul), a cousin of the preceding man
 Lucius Valerius Flaccus (suffect consul 86 BC), brother of the consul in 93 BC
 Lucius Valerius Flaccus (praetor 63 BC), son of Lucius Valerius Flaccus (suffect consul 86 BC)

See also
 Lucius Valerius Flaccus (disambiguation)